Acanthospermum consobrinum is a member of the family Asteraceae and is an endemic species found in Paraguay.

References

consobrinum